Kearley is a surname. Notable people with the surname include:

Bull Kearley (1891–1977), American college football player
Charles Kearley (1904–1989), English property developer and art collector
Michelle Kearley, Australian actress

See also
Kearney (surname)